Charles Steven Booth was a former Canadian diplomat. He was Representative to the International Civil Aviation Organization.

External links 
 Foreign Affairs and International Trade Canada Complete List of Posts

Booth, Charles Steven
Year of birth missing
Place of birth missing
Year of death missing
International Civil Aviation Organization people